Cypriot singer Ivi Adamou has recorded material for one studio album and two extended plays and has been featured on songs on other artists respective albums.

Adamou's first album, Kalokairi Stin Kardia, was released in 2010 and was an EP that included seven tracks with additionally two karaoke versions and one remix. "A*G*A*P*I", "Sose Me" and "To Mistiko Mou Na Vris" were the singles from the EP. Later, in December 2010, Adamou released a Christmas EP that included four tracks, with "Santa Claus Is Coming to Town" being the only single from it.

Her debut studio album, San Ena Oniro, was released in 2011 and had ten tracks including her collaboration single with Melisses, "Krata Ta Matia Sou Klista". The singles apart from the collaboration single, were "Kano Mia Efhi", "Voltes St Asteria" and "La La Love", with the latter being included in the euro edition of the album.

Apart from album singles, Adamou was featured on three other songs with two of them being with Stavento; "San Erthi I Mera" and "Na Sou Tragoudo". Adamou was also featured on Pink Noisy's "Avra", a re-make of the song "Mestral" by the same artists featuring Radio Killer.

List

See also 
 Ivi Adamou
 Ivi Adamou discography

References 

Songs
Adamou